Barron Municipal Airport,  is a city owned public use airport located in the central business district of Barron, a city in Barron County, Wisconsin, United States.

Although most airports in the United States use the same three-letter location identifier for the FAA and International Air Transport Association (IATA), this airport is assigned 9Y7 by the FAA but has no designation from the IATA.

Facilities and aircraft 
It has one turf runway: 9/27 is 2,010 by 260 feet (613 x 79 m).

For the 12-month period ending August 4, 2022, the airport had 6,550 aircraft operations, an average of 126 per week; 99% general aviation and 1% air taxi. In January 2023, there were 18 aircraft based at this airport: 17 single-engine and 1 ultralight.

See also
 List of airports in Wisconsin

References

External links 

Airports in Wisconsin
Buildings and structures in Barron County, Wisconsin